Pentre is a small village in the community of Tregaron, Ceredigion, Wales, which is 60.4 miles (97.2 km) from Cardiff and 169.5 miles (272.8 km) from London. Pentre is represented in the Senedd by Elin Jones (Plaid Cymru) and is part of the Ceredigion constituency in the House of Commons.

References

See also 
 List of localities in Wales by population

Villages in Ceredigion
Tregaron